A Slipping-Down Life is a 1999 romantic drama film directed by Toni Kalem. Based on a novel by Anne Tyler, it stars Lili Taylor and Guy Pearce.

Plot
Shy loner Evie (Taylor) hears musician Drumstrings Casey (Pearce) on the radio one night and becomes infatuated with him. She pursues him, carving his name (sadly, backwards) in her forehead with broken glass, and eventually they meet and then marry. They both still struggle to make something of their lives.

Cast
 Lili Taylor as Evie Decker
 Guy Pearce as Drumstrings Casey
 Irma P. Hall as Clotelia
 John Hawkes as David Elliot
 Veronica Cartwright as Mrs. Casey
 Marshall Bell as Mr. Casey
 Johnny Goudie as Jesse
 Shawnee Smith as Faye-Jean Lindsay
 Sara Rue as Violet
 Bruno Kirby as Kiddie Arcades Manager
 Tom Bower as Mr. Decker
 Margaret Bowman as Mrs. Harrison
 Jo Ann Farabee as Woman at Salon
 Harv Morgan as Dick St. Clair
 Jason Russell Waller as Audience Member #1
 Lew Temple as Audience Member #2
 Jason Kavalewitz as Young Sexband

Distribution
A Slipping-Down Life premiered on January 22, 1999, at the Sundance Film Festival, distributed by Lions Gate Entertainment. It was given limited theatrical release in the United States on May 14, 2004.

Awards
The film was nominated for the Grand Jury Prize at the 1999 Sundance Festival. In 2004 it won the Special Jury Prize at the Indianapolis International Film Festival and Lili Taylor won the Achievement Award at the Newport Beach Film Festival. In that year it was also nominated for a Golden Trailer Award.

References

External links
 
 

1999 films
1999 romantic drama films
Films based on American novels
American independent films
American romantic drama films
1999 independent films
1990s English-language films
1990s American films